The Douglas XB-19 was a four-engined, piston-driven heavy bomber produced by the Douglas Aircraft Company for the United States Army Air Forces (USAAF) during the early 1940s. It was the largest bomber built for the USAAF until 1946, and was originally given the designation XBLR-2 (XBLR denoting "Experimental Bomber Long Range").

Design and development
The XB-19 project was intended to test flight characteristics and design techniques for giant bombers. Despite advances in technology that made the XB-19 obsolete before it was completed, the Army Air Corps believed the prototype would be useful for testing despite Douglas Aircraft wanting to cancel the expensive project. Its construction took so long that competition for the contracts to build the XB-35 and XB-36 occurred two months before its first flight.

The plane first flew on 27 June 1941, more than three years after the construction contract was awarded. It was based at Wright Field from January to November 1942. In 1943 the Wright R-3350 engines were replaced with liquid-cooled W24 Allison V-3420-11 by the aircraft division of Fisher Body in support of the XB-39 project. As part of the program it was equipped with engine driven auxiliary powerplants. After completion of testing the XB-19 was earmarked for conversion into a cargo aircraft, but modifications were not completed, and the aircraft flew for the last time on August 17, 1946. It was eventually scrapped at Tucson in June 1949.

Surviving artifacts

The new U.S. Air Force had plans to save the B-19 for eventual display, but in 1949 the Air Force did not have a program to save historic aircraft and the Air Force Museum had not yet been built. The B-19 was therefore scrapped, but two of its enormous main tires were saved. One was put on display at the Hill Aerospace Museum at Hill Air Force Base in Ogden, Utah and the other has been on display at the National Museum of the United States Air Force in Dayton, Ohio, in the "Early Years" gallery for many years.

Specifications (XB-19)

See also

References

Footnotes

Notes

Further reading

External links

 Encyclopedia of American aircraft

1940s United States bomber aircraft
B-19
Four-engined tractor aircraft
Low-wing aircraft
Aircraft first flown in 1941
Four-engined piston aircraft